Robin Nilsson (born September 15, 1988 in Tomelilla) is a Swedish footballer who plays for Trelleborgs FF in Allsvenskan.

Career

Club career
On 17 October 2019 it was confirmed, that Nilsson would return home to Ängelholms FF for the 2020 season.

References

External links
 
 
 

1988 births
Swedish footballers
Swedish expatriate footballers
Sweden youth international footballers
Living people
Allsvenskan players
Superettan players
Ettan Fotboll players
Danish 1st Division players
Malmö FF players
Lyngby Boldklub players
Ängelholms FF players
Gefle IF players
Trelleborgs FF players
Swedish expatriate sportspeople in Denmark
Expatriate men's footballers in Denmark
Association football midfielders